Odessa Rose Jorgensen, known mononymously as Odessa, is an American singer, songwriter, and violinist from California.

Jorgensen learned violin from age four, and her father played in surf rock groups in the 1960s. Though born in California, she lived for many years in Nashville. As a teenager, she performed as a violinist at Carnegie Hall and modeled for Versace. She played violin and sang vocals in the bluegrass group Bearfoot in the late 2000s. After leaving Bearfoot, she played violin with Old Crow Medicine Show, Abigail Washburn, and Edward Sharpe and the Magnetic Zeroes. While working with Edward Sharpe and the Magnetic Zeroes, she was hit by a car while riding her bike in Nashville, which resulted in a skull fracture, a spine injury, and the loss of several teeth. She continued touring as a violinist, even though she could not sing during this time, and worked on tracks for an anticipated self-titled album.

In 2014, she signed with Chop Shop/Republic, and released an EP produced by Jacquire King in September of that year; she then released a solo album digitally in 2015. The single "I Will Be There" was licensed for use in a Subaru commercial. In 2019, she issued a sophomore digital album, All Things, released on the independent Public Hi-Fi Records and composed of songs written primarily while on a retreat at Eagle Rock, Los Angeles.

Discography
Odessa EP (Chop Shop/Republic, 2014)
Odessa LP (Chop Shop/Republic, 2015)
All Things (Public Hi-Fi, 2019)

References

Musicians from California
American violinists
American women singers
Songwriters from California
Living people
Year of birth missing (living people)
21st-century American women